The 1998 S.League was the third season of the S.League, the top professional football league in Singapore. Teams played each other once both home and away, in a 20-match season.

The 1998 S.League was won by Singapore Armed Forces, their second consecutive title.

Teams

Jurong left Bukit Gombak Stadium upon completion of their new home ground Jurong East Stadium. Home United also relocated, leaving Jalan Besar Stadium to move into Bishan Stadium. Two new teams entered into the competition – Gombak United (who took the place of Jurong playing at Bukit Gombak Stadium) and Marine Castle United who made Hougang Stadium their home – taking the number of participating teams to eleven. Tiong Bahru United were renamed Tanjong Pagar United for the 1998 season.

Foreign players
Each club is allowed to have up to a maximum of 5 foreign players.

League table

Singapore Armed Forces qualified to compete in the 1999–2000 Asian Club Championship. This was their second appearance in continental competition. The club met with more success than in their first appearance, defeating Royal Dolphins of the Cambodian League 11–3 on aggregate in the East Asian first round. They were defeated in the second round by Sinthana of the Thai Premier League, going down 3–2 on aggregate.

Top scorers

External links
 S.League 1998

Singapore Premier League seasons
1
Sing
Sing